George William Rickards (16 December 1877 – 27 November 1943) was a British politician. He was Conservative Member of Parliament (MP) for Skipton from 1933 to 1943.

References

External links 
 
 

1877 births
1943 deaths
UK MPs 1931–1935
UK MPs 1935–1945
Conservative Party (UK) MPs for English constituencies